The 13th annual Powerlist was judged by a panel chaired by Dame Linda Dobbs and published in October 2019; sponsored by J.P. Morgan & Co., pwc, linklaters and The Executive Leadership Council.

Top 10

Outside Top 10

Also listed in the 2020 Powerlist were the following people, organised by industry:

Arts, Fashion and Design
 Adwoa Aboah - fashion model and founder of Gurls Talk
 Chi-chi Nwanoku, OBE - classical musician and founder of Chineke! Orchestra
 Duro Olowu  - fashion designer
 Dr Shirley J Thompson, OBE - composer, conductor and Reader in Music, University of Westminster
 Isaac Julien, CBE - artist and filmmaker
 Lemn Sissay, OBE - poet, author, broadcaster
 Matthew Morgan - founder of Afropunk Festival
 Valerie Brandes -  founder and CEO of Jacaranda Books

Business, Corporate, Financiers and Entrepreneurs
 Alan Smith - Global Head of Risk Strategy and Chief of Staff, Global Risk at HSBC
 Arunma Oteh, OON - academic scholar, St Antony's College, Oxford, former Treasurer and Vice President of the World Bank
 Bukola Adisa - Head of Framework and Design at Barclays
 Camille Drummond - Vice President, Global Business Services at BP
 Eric Collins - CEO and Founding Member, Impact X Capital Partners
 Gary Stewart - Director, Telefonica Open Future & Wayra UK
 Jason Black (J2K) - co-founder of Crep Protect and co-owner of Crepe and Cones
 Lindelwe Lesley Ndlovu  - CEO, AXA Africa Specialty Risks, Lloyd's of London
 Netsai Mangwende - Head of Finance for Great Britain, Willis Towers Watson
 Pamela Hutchinson - Global Head of Diversity and Inclusion, Bloomberg
 Patricia Lewis - Managing Director & Head of European Loans and Special Situations Sales, BofA Securities
 Sandra Wallace - UK Managing Partner, DLA Piper
 Dame Sharon White - Chairman, John Lewis Partnership
 Tavaziva Madzinga - CEO, Swiss Re UK & Ireland
 Tevin Tobun - founder and CEO, GV Group Gate Ventures
 Wol Kolade -  Managing Partner, Livingbridge
 Yvonne Ike  - Managing Director and Head of Sub Saharan Africa region, BofA Securities

Media, Publishing and Entertainment
 Ade Adepitan, MBE - TV presenter and Paralympic wheelchair basketball player
 Afua Hirsch - journalist, author, broadcaster
 Akala - rapper, journalist, poet and activist
 Anne Mensah - Vice-president of Content UK, Netflix
 Amma Asante, MBE - writer, director
 Charlene White - ITN News anchor
 David Olusoga, OBE - historian, Joint Creative Director of Uplands Television Ltd
 Femi Oguns, MBE - founder and CEO of Identity School of Acting
 Gary Younge - journalist and author
 Idris Elba, OBE - actor, writer, producer, musician and DJ
 John Boyega - Actor
 Kanya King, CBE -CEO/Founder, MOBO Awards
 Lorna Clarke - Head of Production, BBC Radio 2 & BBC Radio 6 Music
 Marcus Ryder - Chief International Editor of China Global Television Network Digital
 Mo Abudu - CEO/Executive Chair, EbonylifeTV
 Naomie Harris, OBE - actor
 Paulette Simpson - Executive, Corporate Affairs and Public Policy, Jamaica National Group; Executive Director, The Voice Media Group
 Reggie Yates - actor, broadcaster and DJ
 Reni Eddo-Lodge - journalist, author
 Simon Frederick - artist, photographer, director
 Sir Lenny Henry - actor, writer, campaigner
 Vanessa Kingori, MBE - publisher, British Vogue
 Yolisa Phahle - CEO, General Entertainment, Naspers Ltd

Politics, Law and Religion
 Baroness Floella Benjamin DBE, DL - Peer, House of Lords, policy maker, campaigner for children's rights
 David Lammy, MP - Member of Parliament for Tottenham
 Dr Sandie Okoro - Senior Vice President and Group General Counsel, World Bank
 Grace Ononiwu, CBE - Chief Crown Prosecutor, West Midlands
 Joshua Siaw, MBE - Partner, White & Case
 Dr Kathryn Nwajiaku - Head of International Dialogue on Peacebuilding and Statebuilding Secretariat, OECD
 Martin Forde, QC - barrister
 Rev Rose Hudson-Wilkin - Chaplain to the Speaker of the House of Commons
 Segun Osuntokun - Managing Partner, Bryan Cave Leighton Paisner

Public, Third Sector and Education
 Beverley De Gale, OBE & Orin Lewis, OBE - Founders, ACLT (African Caribbean Leukemia Trust)
 Dr Cheron Byfield - Governor and founder of King Solomon International Business School and CEO Excell3
 Dr Dayo Olukoshi, OBE - Principal, Brampton Manor Academy 
 Dr Margaret Casely-Hayford, CBE - Chair, Shakespeare's Globe, Chancellor of Coventry University, Non-Executive Director, Co-op Group
 Marvin Rees - Mayor of Bristol
 Meghan, Duchess of Sussex - campaigner, actress
 Nira Chamberlain - President of Institute of Mathematics and its Applications
 Professor Funmi Olonisakin - Vice-President and Vice-Principal International and Professor of Security, Leadership and Development at King's College London
 Lord Woolley - Co-founder/Director, Operation Black Vote
 Sonita Alleyne, OBE - Master, Jesus College, Cambridge and member of BBC Trust

Science, Medicine and Engineering
 Dame Donna Kinnair - CEO & General Secretary, Royal College of Nursing
 Dr Emeka Okaro - Consultant Obstetrician and Gynaecologist
 Dr Ian Nnatu - Consultant psychiatrist
 Dr Joy Odili - Consultant plastic surgeon
 Dr Martin Griffiths - Lead trauma surgeon, Royal London Hospital & Clinical Director for Violence Reduction, NHS
 Dr Samantha Tross - Consultant Orthopaedic Surgeon
 Dr Sylvia Bartley - Senior Global Director, Medtronic Philanthropy
 Prof. Laura Serrant, OBE - Head of Department and Professor of Community and Public Health Nursing at Manchester Metropolitan University
 Prof. Jacqueline Dunkley-Bent, OBE - Chief Midwifery Officer, NHS England

Sports
 Anthony Joshua, OBE - boxer
 Dina Asher Smith - British record-holding sprinter
 Eniola Aluko - Footballer
 Lewis Hamilton, MBE - Formula One champion
 Luol Deng - former NBA player
 Nicola Adams, OBE - boxer
 Raheem Sterling - footballer

Technology
 Dr Anne-Marie Imafidon, MBE - CEO and co-founder, Stemettes
 Baroness Oona King - Vice President of Diversity and Inclusion, Snap Inc.
 Ian Greenstreet - founder and Chairman, Infinity Capital Partners and Member on the Advisory Board, London Stock Exchange
 Ije Nwokorie - Senior Director, Apple Inc.
 Mariéme Jamme - CEO, SpotOne Global Solutions and Advisory Board Member, Data-Pop Alliance
 Martin Ijaha, CBE - founder, Neyber
 Nneka Abulokwe, OBE - founder and CEO, MicroMax Consulting

References

Categories
 
Biographical dictionaries
Lists of British people
Yearbooks